Jari "Jartsi" Kainulainen (born 29 April 1970) is a Finnish bass guitarist. He is best known for having been the bass player of the power metal band Stratovarius from 1993 until 2005. Kainulainen is currently the bassist of Masterplan, having joined 2012.

After his period in Stratovarius he founded his own band called Mess.

Between 2002 and 2006, Kainulainen played bass with Kotipelto, a Finnish power metal band formed by Timo Kotipelto, singer of Stratovarius.

In 2007 he joined the Swedish progressive power metal band Evergrey.

In 2010 Jari Kainulainen created the power metal supergroup Symfonia along with Andre Matos, Timo Tolkki, Mikko Härkin and Uli Kusch.

He joined Masterplan in 2012. In 2013 he created the melodic power metal band Shadowquest.

Kainulainen plays Ibanez 6 string basses and uses Ampeg amplifiers. He is influenced by Geezer Butler, Billy Sheehan, Cliff Burton, and Steve Harris.

Discography

Masterplan
Novum Initium (2013)
Keep Your Dream Alive (2015)
PumpKings (cover album of Helloween by Roland Grapow) (2017)

Shadowquest
Armoured IV Pain (2015)

Stratovarius
Dreamspace (1994)Fourth Dimension (1996)
Episode (1996)
Visions (1997)
Destiny (1998)
Live! Visions of Europe (1998)
Infinite (2000)
Intermission (2001)
Elements Pt. 1 (2003)
Elements Pt. 2 (2003)
Stratovarius (2005)

Evergrey
Torn (2008)

Symfonia
In Paradisum (2011)

Kotipelto
Waiting for the Dawn (2002)
Coldness (2004)

References

External links

Kainulainen's MySpace

1970 births
Living people
Finnish heavy metal bass guitarists
Stratovarius members
Masterplan (band) members
21st-century bass guitarists
Evergrey members
Symfonia members